Teams from 150 high schools competed as varsity ice hockey teams in Western and Eastern Pennsylvania. Unlike many other high school sport in Pennsylvania, hockey is not run under Pennsylvania Interscholastic Athletic Association umbrella. However, Pennsylvania's high school ice hockey is sanctioned by USA Hockey and varsity-level programs are marginally overseen by the NHL Pittsburgh Penguins and Philadelphia Flyers organizations through the Penguins Cup and the Flyers Cup. However although it is considered a club it is still a part of the High School and is affiliated with the school.

Format 
Varsity teams are divided into four divisions, AAA, AA, A, and B (Open). Western divisional champions earn a bid to the Penguins Cup playoff tournament. Eastern divisional teams earn a bid by invitation to the Flyers Cup playoff tournament. All teams are eligible except non-pure and second varsity teams.

State Championship 
The Pennsylvania State High School Ice Hockey Championship is awarded through a state tournament.  The tournament pits the champions from the Penguins Cup and Flyers Cup with the winners receiving the AAA, AA, or A Pennsylvania Cup. The location changes every year rotating between Western and Eastern cities. Attempts to mirror the PIAA state championships by hosting the games in Hershey, Pennsylvania, lasted a single season, with only the 2005 series being held at the historic Hersheypark Arena. Starting in 2014 the state championship is now being playing at Pegula Ice Arena The first Pennsylvania Cup was held at the University of Pennsylvania's Class of 1923 Ice Rink under the auspices of The Philadelphia Flyers "Hockey Central" organization. USA Hockey's Mid America Director Frank Black and The Flyers' Andy Abramson organized the championship, after Flyers President Robert "Bob" J. Butera and Penguins EVP Paul Martha agreed to sponsor the event annually.
 in State College, PA.

Alumni 
Notable professional players that have participated in Pennsylvania high school hockey include Chad Kolarik, Colby Cohen, Brian O'Neill, Ray Dilauro, Mike Richter, Ryan Malone, R.J. Umberger, Mike Weber, Nick Foligno, Eric Tangradi, Nate Guenin, Brandon Saad, Dylan Reese, Shane Ferguson, Matt Bartkowski, John Zeiler, Christian Hanson, William Thomas, Grant Lewis, Tony Voce, Ray Staszak, Matt Clackson, Rob Madore, Ryan Mulhern, John Gibson and Ryan Gunderson. The state has also produced alumni that went on to play minor professional and elite collegiate levels.

Historical timeline 
 1969 – Inter-County Scholastic Hockey League forms with six teams (Cardinal O'Hara High School, Conestoga High School, Haverford High School, Marple Newtown High School, Saint Joseph's Preparatory School, Swarthmore High School)
 1970–1971 – Western Pennsylvania High School Hockey League forms in April at the Alpine Ice Chalet. Teams include Shaler, Churchill, Mt Lebanon, Penn Hills, Upper St Clair, and West Mifflin North
 1971–1972 – Western Pennsylvania High School Hockey League completes first season of play at the Alpine Ice Chalet as Churchill, Mt Lebanon, Penn Hills, Shaler, Upper St Clair and West Mifflin North. Mt Lebanon defeats Penn Hills, 5–4 in overtime, to capture the first WPHSHL Championship.
 1972–73 – Western Pennsylvania High School Hockey League expands to 19 schools as Richland, Chartiers Valley, Central Catholic, Bethel Park, Peabody, Fox Chapel, Lawrenceville Catholic, General Braddock, Armstrong, Gateway and Canevin participate. Churchill wins the WPHSHL crown over Richland in 4–3 in overtime.
 1972–73 – Ohio Valley League forms out of the Sewickley Ice Arena and South Penn High School Hockey League forms out of the Rostraver Ice Garden
 1974 – Baldwin High School has an undefeated regular season and wins the South Penn League title
 1975 – WPHSHL becomes Western Pennsylvania Interscholastic Hockey League. Baldwin High School wins State of Pennsylvania Title
 1975 – Lake Shore Hockey League forms
 1975 – Lower Bucks County Scholastic Hockey League forms
 1975 – Inaugural Pennsylvania High School Hockey Championships in Erie, Pa at the Glenwood Ice Arena
 1980 – First Flyers Cup tournament Archbishop Carroll finds a way past Haverford's star goalie Christopher Cifone and defeats Haverford High School. The first Flyers Cup was organized by the Flyers' Hockey Central organization, sponsored by the Pepsi Cola Bottlers of the Delaware Valley. The founding organizers included Aaron Siegel, President of The Spectrum, Andy Abramson, Executive Director/Flyers Hockey Central, Kenneth R. Gesner, Atlantic District Director, Jack Hunt, President, InterCounty Scholastic Hockey League, Andy Richards, President, Suburban High School Hockey League, Paul Saylor, Commissioner, Lower Bucks County Scholastic Hockey League and Jim Cunningham, President, Lower Bucks County Scholastic Hockey League. Archbishop Carroll's Scott Chamness was named the first recipient of the Bobby Clarke Award as the Flyers Cup's Most Valuable Player.
 1981 – First Pennsylvania Cup, State High School Ice Hockey Championship was held at the University of Pennsylvania's Class of 23 Rink. The Pennsylvania Cup was organized Frank J. Black, USA Hockey Director for Mid-America Region, Andy Abramson, Executive Director of the Philadelphia Flyers/Hockey Central and Atlantic District Registrar, Atlantic District Director Kenneth R. Gesner, with support by Robert J. Butera, President of the Philadelphia Flyer and Paul Martha, former executive vice president, general counsel and CEO with the Pittsburgh Penguins. The Flyers and Penguins organizations contributed financial and operational support, paying for ice time, game officials, publication of the game day program and support staff. The event was played under as a sanctioned USA Hockey (AHAUS) tournament.
 1991 – Lehigh Valley Scholastic Hockey League forms
 1994 – CPIHL forms
 1996 – PA Hockey Scholastic Showcase begins play
 1999 – WPIHL, LKSHL and SHIHL merge to form PIHL
 2000 – Pennsylvania Interscholastic Hockey League forms
 2004 – Eastern High School Hockey League forms
 2005 – AAA League forms for Flyers Cup
 2007 – Inter County Scholastic Hockey League splits into three divisions, ICSHL Central, ICSHL Chester County and ICSHL Independents, to copy the divisions PIAA uses to organize schools in other sports

Divisions 
While the western part of the state has been divided into fairly equal levels at the AAA, AA, and A levels, the eastern part has mostly been run by the independent leagues that compete for Flyers Cup. A change was made recently in an effort to provide more uniformity throughout the eastern portion of the state. Whereas the levels were previously determined by where a team finished in its respective leagues, the Flyers Cup recently restructured the system were AAA is all open enrollment schools, AA is the larger public schools, and A is the smaller public schools. The open enrollment schools are not forced to play AAA, but if they do not they cannot qualify for the Flyers Cup. Changes are still being proposed for the 2008–2009 season that could create a second varsity level for open enrollment schools that do not wish to play at the AAA level.

Leagues

Eastern PA 
  Berks Scholastic Ice Hockey League (BSIHL) operated through the end of 2007–2008 season – replaced by EPSHL in 2008–2009 season
  Central Pennsylvania interscholastic Hockey League (CPIHL) (Owned by Mitchell Thompson also referred to as “Big Dick Mitch”)
  East Penn Scholastic Hockey League (EPSHL)
  Eastern High School Hockey League (EHSHL)
  Inter-County Scholastic Hockey League (ICSHL)
  Lehigh Valley Scholastic Hockey League (LVSHL)
  Northeast PA Scholastic Hockey League (NEPASHL)
  Suburban High School Hockey League (SHSHL)
  Lower Bucks County Scholastic Hockey League (LBCSHL)

Western PA 
  Lake Shore Hockey League (LKSHL)
  Pennsylvania Interscholastic Hockey League (PIHL)
(note: teams from West Virginia also play in PIHL.)

Programs

Records

Folded programs

References

External links 
 PA Hockey
 PA Hockey History
 Pennsylvania Interscholastic Hockey League
 Central Penn. Interscholastic Hockey League
 Northeastern PA Scholastic Hockey League (NEPASHL)

High school ice hockey in the United States
High school sports in Pennsylvania
Ice hockey in Pennsylvania
Sports in Philadelphia
Sports in Pittsburgh